Cdk5 and Abl enzyme substrate 2 is a protein that in humans is encoded by the CABLES2 gene.

References

Further reading